Aratani is a Japanese surname. Notable people with the surname include:

 George Aratani (1917–2013), Japanese American businessman
, Japanese football player
, conductor of the Nagoya Philharmonic Orchestra (1974–1980)

Japanese-language surnames